The Raslila, also rendered the Rasalila or the Ras dance, is part of the traditional story of Krishna described in Hindu scriptures such as the Bhagavata Purana and literature such as the Gita Govinda, where he dances with Radha and the gopis of Vraja. Rasalila has also been a popular theme for other India classical dances including  Bharatanatyam, Odissi, Manipuri, Kuchipudi, and Kathak. The Indian classical dance of Kathak evolved from the rasalila of Vraja and Manipuri Raas Leela Classical Dance (Vrindavana) also known as Natwari Nritya, which was revived in 1960s by the Kathak dancer, Uma Sharma.

Etymology
The term, rasa meaning "aesthetics" and lila meaning "act," "play" or "dance" is a concept from Hinduism, which roughly translates to "play (lila) of aesthetics (rasa)," or more broadly as "Dance of Divine Love". Apart from the definition above, the term also comes from the Sanskrit words rasa and lila, with rasa meaning "juice", "nectar", "emotion" or "sweet taste" and lila meaning "act". By taking this etymological breakdown of the word literally, "rasalila" means the "sweet act" (of Krishna). It is often freely rendered as "the dance of love".

Legend 

The rasalila takes place one night when the gopis of Vrindavana, upon hearing the sound of Krishna's flute, sneak away from their households and families to the forest to dance with Krishna throughout the night, which Krishna supernaturally stretches to the length of one kalpa, a Hindu unit of time lasting approximately 4.32 billion years. In the Krishna Bhakti traditions, the rasa-lila is considered to be one most beautiful depiction of soulful love. In these traditions, romantic love between human beings in the material world is seen as a reflection of the soul's original, ecstatic spiritual love of Krishna, in his spiritual world, Goloka.

In the Bhagavata Purana it is stated that whoever faithfully hears or describes the rasalila attains Krishna's pure loving devotion (Suddha-bhakti).

Just as a child plays at its own will with its reflection in a mirror, with the help of his Yogamaya, Krishna sported with the gopis, who are regarded to have been shadows of his own form.

Performance
Rasalila has been a popular theme in Kathak, Bharatanatyam, Odissi, Manipuri, and Kuchipudi dance forms. rasalila is a popular form of folk theatre in the regions of Mathura, Vrindavana in Uttar Pradesh, Nathdwara  amongst various followers of pushtimarg or the vallabh sect and other sects in the regions of India. It is also seen in gaudiya vaishnavism in Nadia a district of West Bengal which is also known for Raas Utsava. Vanga Raas of Santipur is the main festival of this town, Nabadwip also has Shakta Raas.

The Raas Leela (Raas Mahotsav) is also observed as one of the State Festivals of Assam which usually is celebrated during late November or early December. During Raas Mahotsava, several thousand devotees visit the holy temples and satras of Assam every year. The Raas Mahotsav of Majuli, Nalbari and of Howly are noteworthy.

In the tradition of Vaishnavism of Manipur Raas Leela is depicted within Manipuri classical Indian dance and revolves around the story of love between Krishna and Radha, his divine beloved. This form of dance was started by Bhagya Chandra in 1779 and in some parts of India is still performed every year on Krishna Janmashtami (the festival to celebrate Krishna's birthday). According to different traditions, the rasa-lila is performed either by boys and girls, or by girls only. The dance is performed holding dandi (sticks) and is often accompanied with folk songs and devotional music.

The traditional rasalila performances in Vrindavan are famous throughout the Vaishnava world as an experience of the spiritual world. rasalila performance was started by Swami Sri Uddhavaghamanda Devacharya in the early 15th Century CE at Vamshivata in Vrindavan, Mathura. He was a prominent saint of the Nimbarka Sampradaya, and disciple of the world-renowned Swami Sri Harivyasa Devacarya. The Vani literature of Vraja is the transcription of the songs that were heard by Swami Harivyasa Devacarya and his Guru, Swami Shri Shribhatta as they meditated on the Nitya Lila of Radha Krishna. These songs describe the eternal spiritual abode of Radha Krishna, the Sakhis and Nitya Vrindavana Dham - or Nikunja Dham. It became more prominent utsava in 16th and 17th century, when Mahaprabhu Shri Vallabhacharya and Vitthalanatha gusaiji made it more popular.

References

Further reading
 Music in traditional Indian theatre: special reference to Raas Leela, by Rani Balbir Kaur. Shubhi Publications, 2006. .

Bibliography
Dance of Divine Love: The rasalila of Krishna from the Bhagavata Purana, India's classic sacred love story, by Graham M. Schweig. Princeton University Press, Princeton, NJ; 2005.
Rasa - Love Relationships in Transcendence, by Swami B.V. Tripurari
Theatre and Religion on Krishna's Stage, by David Mason, New York: Palgrave, 2009
"Essays on Indo-Aryan Mythology", by Narayan Aiyangar, 1898

External links 

 rasalila at Encyclopædia Britannica
 What is rasalila

Hindu philosophical concepts
Vaishnavism
Culture of Manipur
Hindu dance traditions
Culture of Uttar Pradesh
Krishna
Theatre in India
Musical theatre
Religious vernacular drama
Festivals in Assam